M. S. Ananda (22 April 1933

3 – 24 June 2016), popularly known as M. S. Ananda, was a director in Sri Lankan cinema, as well as a cinematographer, screenwriter and producer.

Personal life
He was married to longtime partner Violet Ananda who was also a film producer. The couple has two daughters. Elder daughter Shyama Ananda is a popular film actress who acted in popular Shyama film series directed by her father M. S. Ananda. Shayama is married Saliya Perera, former captain of the Thurstan College cricket team on 15 December 1980. They have a daughter, Mandeera DeMel and a son Ritchie Perera.

He died on 24 June 2016 at the age of 83. His remains were laid at Jayaratne Funeral parlour in Borella. The final rites was held at the Kanatte Cemetery on 26 June 2016.

Career
He was the chief cameraman of the Ceylon studio. In 1959, Ananda started to work as the cinematographer with the film Gehenu Geta. Then he worked as the assistant cinematographer in the film Ranmuthu Duwa, first colour full-length film of Sri Lanka. Then he worked as the cinematographer in several blockbuster movies such as Nidhanaya, Golu Hadawatha, Madol Duwa, Gehenu Lamai and Akkara Paha.

Later he started to direct the film. His maiden cinema direction came through 1964 film Sithaka Mahima. The first film he directed and produced was Prashawanna, in which his daughter Shyama played a dual role. Then he directed the popular film franchise Shyama by introducing his daughter Shyama Ananda into silver screen. He directed four films in Shyama franchise - Mage Nangi Shyama, Chandi Shyama, Hello Shyama and Mama Baya Nehe Shyama. In 1965 film Satha Panaha directed by Ananda became highly popularized due to the song Chandrame Re Paya Awa sung by H.R. Jothipala.

Filmography

As director

As cinematographer

References

External links
 සිනමාවේ මං සලකුණු - ගොළු හදවත

1933 births
2016 deaths
Sinhalese writers
Sri Lankan screenwriters
Sri Lankan directors
Sri Lankan cinematographers
20th-century screenwriters